The 2006 Bassetlaw District Council election took place on 4 May 2006 to elect members of Bassetlaw District Council in Nottinghamshire, England. One third of the council was up for election.

Election result

Ward results

Carlton

East Retford East

East Retford North

East Retford South

East Retford West

Everton

Harworth

Langold

Misterton

Tuxford and Trent

Worksop East

Worksop North

Worksop North East

Worksop North West

Worksop South

Worksop South East

References

2006 Bassetlaw election result (Archive) 

2006 English local elections
2006
2000s in Nottinghamshire